Bumiayu District is an administrative district (kecamatan) in the Brebes Regency, Central Java, Indonesia. Bumiayu is the centre of community activity in the south of Brebes Regency. It covers 82.09 km2 and had a population of 96,201 at the 2010 Census and 112,680 at the 2020 Census. It formerly included those areas which now form the separate districts of  Tonjong,  Sirampog,  Bantarkawung,  Salem, and  Paguyangan.

This district is located in upland areas, and has major transportation routes through Tegal – Navan, as well as rail access to Cirebon-Purwokerto Jakarta-Yogyakarta, Surabaya. The railway station  is one of the train stops important to this area.

Climate
Bumiayu has a tropical rainforest climate (Af) with heavy to very heavy rainfall year-round.

References

Brebes Regency
Districts of Central Java